The Spanish Ambassador in Havanna is the Ambassador of the Spanish government to the government of Cuba.

History

After the Spanish–American War of 1898-1903, Cuba, the last Spanish colonial territory in America, achieved its independence.
Spain decided to maintain its diplomatic relations uninterruptedly with the island since 1902 (with the appointment of a Charge d'Affaires in Havana), which were consolidated in the year 1903.
Therefore, the first bilateral relations between Spain and Cuba were maintained by mutual interest, which will be determined by the long and intense stage of colonization, as by Cuba's peculiar dependence on the United States.
These relations were immersed in a delicate political-economic context in Cuba, marked by the North American interventions and changes of the Spanish diplomatic representative. Hence, the Spanish Minister of Foreign Affairs in 1909, Pablo Soler Guardiola, considered that the plaza in Havana was the most difficult and important of all the Spanish diplomatic representation of the time abroad.
One of the results is that the old Consulate was elevated to the rank of Legation in the year 1904, and this in turn to the Embassy in 1927, thus intensifying trade relations, opening of consulates, and the signing of treaties and agreements in mainly commercial, financial, tourism and communication areas.
In the course of the years 1958 to 1960, in the words of Juan Pablo de Lojendio, Ambassador of Spain in Cuba, the political situation was complicated by the defeat of General Batista and the recognition of the Revolutionary Government of Cuba by Spain.
During this stage the Francoist administration in Spain maintained its concern about the outcome of the political situation in Cuba, notorious ideological differences between the two governments but without ruling out the principle of historical-cultural relationship between the two countries.

References

Cuba
 
Spain